Henare Te Atua (died 1912) was a notable New Zealand tribal leader. Of Māori descent, he identified with the Ngati Kahungunu iwi.

References

1912 deaths
Ngāti Kahungunu people
Year of birth missing